Susanne Müller (born 12 May 1972) is a former field hockey player from Germany, who was a member of the Women's National Team that won the silver medal at the 1992 Summer Olympics in Barcelona, Spain.

References

External links
 
 databaseOlympics

1972 births
Living people
German female field hockey players
Field hockey players at the 1992 Summer Olympics
Olympic field hockey players of Germany
Olympic silver medalists for Germany
Place of birth missing (living people)
Olympic medalists in field hockey
Medalists at the 1992 Summer Olympics
20th-century German women